David "Devy" Bedok is a former French-Israeli professional football (soccer).

References

1984 births
20th-century French Jews
Israeli Jews
Living people
French footballers
Israeli footballers
Jewish footballers
FC Gueugnon players
French emigrants to Israel
Maccabi Herzliya F.C. players
Israeli Premier League players
Association football midfielders